The Nissan NV (Nissan Van) is a term used by the Japanese automaker Nissan for a number of their commercial vans:

Nissan NV100 Clipper - A badge engineered Mitsubishi Minicab/Suzuki Every for the Japanese market
Nissan NV100 Clipper Rio - A passenger car variant of the NV100 Clipper, badge engineered Suzuki Every Wagon for the Japanese market
Nissan NV150 AD - A subcompact van and station wagon for the Japanese market
Nissan NV200 (NV200 Vanette) - A light van and leisure activity vehicle, for Asian, European, and American markets
Nissan NV250 - A badge engineered Renault Kangoo, for European markets
Nissan NV300 - A badge engineered Renault Trafic, for European markets
Nissan NV350 Caravan/NV350 Urvan - A light van or minibus, for Asian markets
Nissan NV400 - A badge engineered Renault Master, for European markets
Nissan NV1500/NV2500/NV3500 - A full size van, for the North American market